Ger Brennan is an Irish Gaelic footballer who plays for St Vincents and, formerly, for the Dublin county team.

Early life
From a family of nine, he attended Belvedere College. At Belvedere he played rugby, soccer, hurling and Gaelic football.

Graduating from Maynooth College with undergraduate and master's degrees, he qualified as a school teacher and taught Irish and religion at St. Kevin's College, Ballygall Road, in Dublin 11. In November 2015 he was appointed Gaelic Games Executive at University College Dublin.

Playing career

Club
Brennan won his first Dublin Senior Football Championship medal with St Vincents in 2007 in the final against St Brigids at Parnell Park. He then went on to win the Leinster Senior Club Football Championship final against Tyrrellspass of Westmeath. Brennan was chosen as the Leinster club player of the year for his performances in the Leinster club championship with St Vincents.

Brennan won the 2008 All-Ireland Senior Club Football Championship with St Vincents in a hard fought game. He won the Dublin Senior Football Championship for St. Vincents, as captain, in 2013.

Inter-county
Brennan made his national league debut for Dublin against Tyrone on 3 February 2007.  He was a member of Dublin team that won the 2007 O'Byrne Cup, playing against Laois at O'Connor Park in Offaly. The game finished on a scoreline of 1-18 to 2-13. He finished the tournament with a total of 0-04.

In 2008, he retired from Dublin's football panel, citing burnout and fatigue as his reasons. However, on 30 July 2008, he was named in Dublin's panel for the quarter-final and accepted a return. He was part of the victorious Dublin squad that won the 2011 All-Ireland Senior Football Championship. He won an All-Ireland with Dublin for a second time in 2013, scoring two points in the final against Mayo.

In October 2015, Brennan announced his retirement from Inter County football but will continue to play club football.

Personal life
Brennan is a Catholic who has spoken about his faith in God. He has stated that while non-denominational schools may teach subjects such as science, Catholic schools "enable young students to have the skills to pray".

Brennan was praised for his "nonchalant delivery" of thanks to the "girlfriends and boyfriends of the players" after St Vincent's defeated Castlebar Mitchels in the 2014 All-Ireland Club Championship Final at Croke Park (a speech delivered in front of a live television audience). However just over a year later, Brennan wrote an op-ed for the Irish Independent arguing against the legalisation of same-sex marriage in that year's Marriage Equality referendum, which was ultimately carried in a 62% to 38% popular vote.  His stance was criticised by others, including fellow GAA star Conor Cusack.

References

Year of birth missing (living people)
Living people
Alumni of St Patrick's College, Maynooth
Dublin inter-county Gaelic footballers
Gaelic football backs
Irish chaplains
Irish schoolteachers
People educated at Belvedere College
Religion and education
St Vincents (Dublin) Gaelic footballers
Winners of two All-Ireland medals (Gaelic football)